The oriental ctenotus (Ctenotus orientalis)  is a species of skink found in Australia.

References

orientalis
Reptiles described in 1971
Taxa named by Glen Milton Storr